General elections were held in Bosnia and Herzegovina on 12 October 2014. They decided the makeup of Bosnia and Herzegovina's Presidency as well as national, entity, and cantonal governments. Voter turnout was 54.4%.

The elections for the House of Representatives were divided into two; one for the Federation of Bosnia and Herzegovina and one for Republika Srpska. In the presidential election, voters in the Federation re-elected Bosniak Bakir Izetbegović and elected Croat Dragan Čović, while voters in Republika Srpska elected Serb Mladen Ivanić. The Party of Democratic Action emerged as the largest party in the House of Representatives, winning 10 of the 42 seats.

While the Bosniak member Bakir Izetbegović was the only member of the tripartite Presidency to be re-elected, Serb member Mladen Ivanić was chosen as the first one to chair the Presidency. Izetbegović said: "In the next four years, I expect the Presidency to be a strong engine driving this country forward on the path of reform toward reaching our most important goal — to become a rightful member of the union of free and democratic European nations." Ivanić said that "the people in Bosnia and Herzegovina are exhausted and tired of quarrels and confrontations, trapped in a vicious circle of economic crisis, enormous unemployment. They are depressed from a lack of ideas on how this situation could change. This must change." He further added that everyone's interest was served by cooperating with both the United States and Russia.

Electoral system
The three members of the Presidency are elected by plurality. In Republika Srpska voters elect the Serb representative, whilst in the Federation of Bosnia and Herzegovina voters elect the Bosniak and Croat members.

The 42 members of the House of Representatives are elected by proportional representation in two constituencies, the Federation of Bosnia and Herzegovina and Republika Srpska.

Results

Presidency

House of Representatives

By entity

Federation of Bosnia and Herzegovina

Republika Srpska

References

External links
Central Election Committee BiH

Elections in Bosnia and Herzegovina
Bosnia
2014 in Bosnia and Herzegovina
October 2014 events in Europe
Election and referendum articles with incomplete results